Mexico recognizes 67 federally protected natural areas as national parks, which are administered by the National Commission of Protected Natural Areas (CONANP), a branch of the federal Secretariat of the Environment and Natural Resources.

List of national parks

See also
Mexican Protected Natural Areas

References

Sources
 CONANP listing of parks (Spanish)
Guia Roji: Por las carreteras de México, 2006

External links

CONANP website
The Secretariat of Environment and Natural Resources 
Mexico Parks at Planeta.com

Mexico
Mexico geography-related lists
Lists of tourist attractions in Mexico